Hemchandra Das Kanungo (4 August 1871 – 8 April 1951) was an Indian nationalist and a member of the Anushilan Samiti. Kanungo travelled to Paris in 1907, where he learnt the technique of assembling picric acid bombs from exiled Russian revolutionaries. Kanungo's knowledge was disseminated throughout Indian nationalist organisations in the Raj and abroad. In 1908, Kanungo was one of the principal co-accused with Aurobindo Ghosh in the Alipore Bomb Case (1908–09). He was sentenced to transportation for life in the Andamans, but was released in 1921.

He was probably the first revolutionary from India who went abroad to obtain military and political training. He obtained training from the Russian emigre in Paris. He returned to India in January 1908. He opened a secret bomb factory "Anushilon Samiti" at Maniktala near Kolkata, founder members of which were Hemchandra Kanungo, Aurobindo Ghosh (Sri Aurobindo) and his brother, Barindra Kumar Ghosh. He was one of the creators of the Calcutta flag, based on which the first flag of independent India was raised by Bhikaiji Cama on 22 August 1907 at the International Socialist Conference in Stuttgart, Germany.

Biography
Hemachandra decided that what was needed was technical know-how, and he went to Europe to get it. He sold his house in Calcutta to arrange money for the trip. Arriving in Marseille toward the end of 1906, he spent a few months trying to get in contact with revolutionaries, or people who knew revolutionaries, in Switzerland, France, and England. Finally, he found a backer to support him while he studied chemistry in Paris. Someone introduced Joseph Albert, known as Libertad, to Hemchandra and his friend Pandurang Bapat in July 1907. With the help of a female anarchist, apparently Emma Goldman, they were admitted to a party headed by a mysterious Russian known as Ph.D. During the latter part of 1907, the two Indians studied history, geography, economics, socialism, communism, and finally, the subjects they had come to learn - explosive chemistry and revolutionary organization.

Hemchandra returned from Europe with a trunk full of up-to-date technical literature, the most important item of which was a seventy-page manual on bomb-making, translated from the Russian. Hemchandra had not intended to join forces with Barindra, but after a talk with Sri Aurobindo, agreed to cooperate.

A suicide squad of two members was sent to kill Kingsford at Muzaffarpur. After bombing at wrong target, Prafulla Chaki committed suicide before the British Indian Police detained him alive but Khudiram Bose didn't do so and the Police arrested him. As a result of this incident, the covert bomb factory established by Hemchandra was raided by the British Police and shut down. Almost all of the members were arrested in a short period of time.

References

Indian revolutionaries
Revolutionaries of Bengal during British Rule
1871 births
1951 deaths
Indian prisoners sentenced to life imprisonment
Prisoners and detainees of British India
Indian independence activists from West Bengal